Kudumbashree (കുടുംബശ്രീ) is the poverty eradication and women empowerment programme implemented by the State Poverty Eradication Mission (SPEM) of the Government of Kerala.

Etymology and common name

The word Kutumbashree is written as Kudumbashree ( which may be pronounced കുടുംബശ്രീ in Malayalam) in all official documents. In Malayalam language, the name Kutumbashree means 'Prosperity of the family'.
The name is also used to refer to a community network in Kerala having a three-tier structure. The Neighbourhood Groups (NHGs) are the  primary level units of this network, the next level being Area Development Societies (ADS) functioning at the ward level, and the top level being the Community Development Societies (CDS).

History
In 1998, Kutumbashree for the empowerment of women, was launched by the E. K. Nayanar Government. Today, Kudumbashree is Kerala's 43 lakh women community network, which is spread across 941 Panchayats. Kudumbashree is always the most ignored pillar of the Kerala Model. 
Kutumbashree represents Kutumbashree Mission or SPEM and any Kutumbashree Networks and its associated activities. Kutumbashree was set up in 1997 following the recommendations of a three-member Task Force appointed by the State government. The Kutumbashree Mission was registered as a Charitable Society under the Travancore-Cochin Literary, Scientific and Charitable Societies Act of 1955 in November 1998. The then Prime Minister of India Atal Bihari Bajpeyee  inaugurated the mission at Malappuram on 17 May 1998 and the Mission started functioning on 1 April 1999 under the Local Self-Government Department of Govt of Kerala.

Kudumbashree Mission
The State Poverty Eradication Mission (SPEM), popularly known as the Kutumbashree Mission is the State government's instrument for poverty eradication under the Local Self-Government Department.

The Mission has a Governing Body chaired by the Minister for Local Self-Government and an executive committee chaired by the Principal Secretary, Local Self-Government Department. The Mission is the agency that promotes and supports the Kutumbashree community network.

The Mission structure consists of a State Mission and 14 District Missions. The State Mission in divided into three divisions – Livelihood Development, Organisation and Social Development, and Systems Support.

Kudumbashree Community Network

The Kutumbashree community network has a three-tier structure. The neighborhood groups (NHGs) are the units at the primary level. The economic status of families is decided based on the standard set by the Government  from time to time. The Area Development Societies (ADSs) form the middle tier of the network.

As on 1 September 2020, the Kutumbashree community network has a total of 4,511,834 members spread over 287,723 NHGs which are organised into 19,489 ADSs and 1064 CDSs.

See also
Kudumbashree National Resource Organisation

References

External links
Kudumbashree
The Kudumbashree Story
Kudumbashree - The world’s largest Women’s network

Additional reading

Rural development organisations in India
Poverty in India
Government welfare schemes in Kerala